The Hyundai Casper is a crossover city car produced by the South Korean automobile manufacturer Hyundai. It is the smallest crossover SUV ever offered by the brand, and also the smallest automobile of any kind that is currently sold by Hyundai.

As the result, it is developed as a four-seater vehicle.

Overview 
The Casper was revealed through a set of images on 1 September 2021. Pre-orders started on 15 September 2021, and the vehicle was released on 29 September. According to Hyundai, the name "Casper" is taken from the Casper skateboarding technique. It's also confirmed that the Casper will be getting advanced driver-assistance systems across three trim lines, Smart, Modern and Inspiration.

The front fascia has turn signal lights situated at the top and circular LED daytime running lights at the bottom. The rear door handle uses a hidden type near the window glass portion, while the parametric pattern of the front grill was applied to the rear lamp to design. Circular turn signal lights was used for the front/rear portions. The rear seat is in the form of two single seats attached.

It uses a pedal-type parking brake. Safety technologies such as forward collision prevention assistance, lane departure prevention assistance, and lane maintenance assistance are available. The Smartstream G1.0 petrol engine is based on the existing  naturally aspirated engine.

The Casper Van was officially released on February 3, 2022. While maintaining the iKONIC design and safety and convenience specifications of the existing Casper model, it has secured a loading capacity of 940 liters by emptying the space in the second row. Hot stamping, a lightweight construction method, was applied to major areas to minimize body deformation in case of collision. The torsional rigidity and average tensile strength were increased through the high-strength lightweight body.

Powertrain

References

External links 

 

Casper
Cars introduced in 2021
Mini sport utility vehicles
Crossover sport utility vehicles
City cars
Front-wheel-drive vehicles